The National Council of Unions of the Industrial and Lower Income Group of Government Workers (MKTR) is a national trade union centre in Malaysia.

The MKTR is a National Labour Centre consisting of twenty-two (22) affiliated national and state unions representing over 200,000 workers in the Lower-income Group, commonly known as category ``C and ``D or Sub-ordinate (Supportive) Groups from the Public Sector. The MKTR has 45,000 dues paying members.

The MKTR is affiliated with the International Trade Union Confederation.

See also

Trade unions in Malaysia

http://www.bernama.com/bm/news.php?id=1656752

Scams’s alert MKTR

https://sebenarnya.my/terdapat-surat-yang-menggunakan-nama-ketua-pengarah-kerja-raya-bagi-mendapatkan-tajaan-tabung-kebajikan-untuk-kakitangan-kkr-malaysia/

References

External links
 

Trade unions in Malaysia
International Trade Union Confederation
Trade unions established in 1956